Evangelista Latino Enrico Vanni OFM Cap. (28 December 1878 – 9 May 1962) was an Italian Bishop and missionary who served as the Apostolic Vicar of Arabia from 1916 to 1927 and the Archbishop of Agra from 1937 to 1955. He also served as the Titular Archbishop of Tenedus from 1916 to 1955 and Titular Archbishop of Bizya from 1955 until his death.

Life 
Evangelista Latino Enrico Vanni was born in Usella, a hamlet of Cantagallo, on 28 December 1878, from a poor and very religious family; Vanni knew from a very young age his determination to enter the seminary.

Priestly Ministry 
On 15 March 1894, he took his first vows and reccived his Alb in the convent of Cortona. A year later, he made his simple profession and the solemn one on 8 December 1898.

On 21 June 1901, he was ordained a priest. He then taught for three years in the Seraphic College of Montevarchi, dedicating himself to preaching at the same time. However, his greatest desire was to go on a mission; On 8 October 1905, the General Minister of the Order of Franciscan Minor Capuchins sent him to India, to the Archdiocese of Agra. First opened by the Jesuits in 1579 and then entrusted to the Capuchins in the beginning of the 19th century, subsequently transformed into an Apostolic Vicariate, Agra then had been elevated to an archdiocese by Pope Leo XIII in 1886. That was a time of significant transformation, from a missionary point of view. In the general chapter of 9 May 1884, it was announced that each mission should be entrusted to a Capuchin province. Between 1890 and 1891, the General Curia of the Order began negotiations with the Tuscan Province to entrust it with the care of the mission in Agra; a vast territory with 20 million inhabitants, of which about 12000 are Catholics. Vanni arrived in 1905, already 35 Tuscan Capuchins were on a mission. The extraordinary abilities of the young Capuchin emerged immediately. He was the Vice-Rector of the St. Peter's College in Agra, an Assistant Chaplain in Bareilly, Superior of the Convent of Barlowgany in Mussoorie, and a Priest of the Cathedral of Agra.

Episcopal Ministry 
His value to engage with the masses did not go unnoticed in Rome, and on 15 April 1916, Pope Benedict XV appointed him Apostolic Vicar of Arabia and Titular Bishop of Tenedo. With humility, he considered himself incapable of holding such a serious office, He received his Episcopal Ordination on 21 September 1916, from the Metropolitan Archbishop of Agra, Carlo Giuseppe Gentili, co-consecrating the Coadjutor Bishop of Allahabad, Giuseppe Angelo Poli and the Bishop of Ajmer, Fortunat-Henri Caumont.

The situation of the Apostolic Vicariate of Arabia was profoundly different from the Indian mission. Alongside the difficulties of language and relations with the Muslims, it was necessary to change the method of evangelization. Msgr. Vanni understood that, in order to transmit the Catholic message, it was necessary to act in the world of education and social intervention; orphanages, schools, hospitals were the places of missionary activity. The unfavorable climate in Aden and the Somali Coast, and a worsening of his health conditions forced Msgr. Vanni to return to Italy and renounce the Vicariate in January 1927.

After a period of convalescence in Prato, he obtained permission to return to India. Although he desired to be a simple missionary, in July 1928, Pope Pius XI appointed him Coadjutor Archbishop of Agra. He succeeded as Archbishop on 21 August 1937. The Real India, as Gandhi claimed, was that of the villages; it was therefore, necessary to evangelize; to create new schools, and through the construction of churches and houses in smaller centers, to reopen the Sardanha seminary. The years of World War II were challenging; Msgr. Vanni's objectives, therefore, suffered an abrupt halt. After the end of the conflict, he resumed his work as an evangelizer with renewed vigor; a dozen new schools were established, new missionaries arrived, and in 1949, the seminary reopened. In 1952 Msgr. Vanni reccived Msgr. Bartolomeo Evangelisti from Porretta as Coadjutor Archbishop.

Retirement 
On 21 November 1955, Pope Pius XII accepted his resignation from the Archdiocese of Agra for health reasons and appointed him Titular Archbishop of Bizia. The fruits of his labor were immediate. On 20 February of the following year, Pope Pius XII established the Diocese of Meerut, entrusting it to the Tuscan Capuchins, while the Archdiocese of Agra was entrusted to the Indian Capuchins, the seminary opened by Msgr. Vanni undoubtedly given good results. Msgr. Vanni remained in Meerut, as a simple missionary, surrounded by the affection of all.

Death 
Msgr. Vanni, died in Dehra Dun, at the foothills of the Himalayans on 9 May 1962 at the age of 83.

References 

 

|-
 

Bishops appointed by Pope Benedict XV
1878 births
1962 deaths
People from the Province of Prato
20th-century Italian Roman Catholic archbishops
Apostolic vicars
Italian Roman Catholic missionaries
Roman Catholic missionaries in India
Capuchin bishops
Roman Catholic bishops in the Middle East
Cantagallo, Tuscany
Catholic missionaries in Arabia
Apostolic Vicariate of Arabia
Catholic Church in the Arabian Peninsula